Charles Buchanan Hickcox (February 6, 1947 – June 14, 2010) was an American competition swimmer, three-time Olympic champion, and former world record-holder in six events.

Career

Hickcox was born in Phoenix, Arizona.  He attended Indiana University, and swam for the Indiana Hoosiers swimming and diving team in National Collegiate Athletic Association (NCAA) competition from 1967 to 1969.  He won a total of seven individual NCAA national championships while swimming for Hoosiers coach Doc Counsilman.

The peak of Hickcox's swimming career occurred between 1967 and 1968 when he set eight world records in the space of sixteen months.  He received four medals (three gold and one silver) at the 1968 Summer Olympics in Mexico City.  He won gold medals in both the 200-meter and 400-meter individual medley events (setting an Olympic record in the 200-meter), and another gold as a member of the world record-setting U.S. team in the men's 4×100-meter medley relay.  He also added a silver medal in the men's 100-meter backstroke.

Hickcox was named World Swimmer of the Year in 1968, and inducted into the International Swimming Hall of Fame as an "Honor Swimmer" in 1976. He was married to Olympic diver Lesley Bush, but they later divorced.

He died from cancer on June 14, 2010, in San Diego at the age of 63.

See also

 List of Indiana University (Bloomington) people
 List of multiple Olympic gold medalists at a single Games
 List of Olympic medalists in swimming (men)
 World record progression 100 metres backstroke
 World record progression 200 metres backstroke
 World record progression 200 metres individual medley
 World record progression 400 metres individual medley
 World record progression 4 × 100 metres freestyle relay
 World record progression 4 × 100 metres medley relay

References

External links
 
 Charles Hickcox (USA) – Honor Swimmer profile at International Swimming Hall of Fame
 Indiana University Archives

1947 births
2010 deaths
American male backstroke swimmers
American male freestyle swimmers
American male medley swimmers
Deaths from cancer in California
World record setters in swimming
Indiana Hoosiers men's swimmers
Olympic gold medalists for the United States in swimming
Olympic silver medalists for the United States in swimming
Pan American Games gold medalists for the United States
Pan American Games silver medalists for the United States
Salmon P. Chase College of Law alumni
Sportspeople from Phoenix, Arizona
Swimmers at the 1967 Pan American Games
Swimmers at the 1968 Summer Olympics
Medalists at the 1968 Summer Olympics
Pan American Games medalists in swimming
Universiade medalists in swimming
Universiade gold medalists for the United States
Medalists at the 1967 Summer Universiade
Medalists at the 1967 Pan American Games
20th-century American people